The 2000 CONCACAF Gold Cup Final was a soccer match played on February 27, 2000, at the Memorial Coliseum, Los Angeles, to determine the winner of the 2000 CONCACAF Gold Cup. Canada beat Colombia 2–0. This was Canada's first Gold Cup title and its second major title, the first since the 1985 CONCACAF Championship. As the Gold Cup champions, Canada represented CONCACAF at the 2001 FIFA Confederations Cup in Japan.

Background
As the lowest-ranked member of the North American Football Union, Canada didn't enter the CONCACAF Gold Cup automatically and had to play the qualification, held in 1999 in the United States. The Canadians qualified by leading the group ahead of Haiti, the other qualified nation, Cuba and El Salvador, both failed to qualify.

Colombia, a member of CONMEBOL was invited to the tournament by CONCACAF. Peru was also invited to the 2000 edition, making them the second South American countries to play the Gold Cup after Brazil, which participated in 1996 and in 1998. By reaching the final match, Colombia repeated the same record as Brazil in 1998.

Both, Colombia and Canada had been runner-ups in their groups during the first round, respectively Groups A and D. However, Canada and South Korea, another invited participant, tied in every criteria in Group D and the qualification had to be decided in the coin toss, favoring Canada.

By the time of the competition, Canada hadn't win a major title since 1985 while Colombia was yet to win a big honor in its history.

Route to the final

Match details

See also 
 1985 CONCACAF Championship
 2001 Copa América Final

Notes

References

External links 
 Award Winners
 Squads

CONCACAF Gold Cup finals
Final
CONCACAF Gold Cup Final
CONCACAF Gold Cup Final
CONCACAF Gold Cup Final
CONCACAF Gold Cup Final
CONCACAF Gold Cup Final
Colombia national football team matches
Canada men's national soccer team matches
Exposition Park (Los Angeles neighborhood)